Khanom Bala Kandi (also Romanized as Khānom Bālā Kandī; also known as Tak Bolāgh-e Qeşr) is a village in Yurchi-ye Gharbi Rural District, Kuraim District, Nir County, Ardabil Province, Iran. At the 2006 census, its population was 101, in 24 families.

References 

Tageo

Towns and villages in Nir County